The name Yellow Mountain may refer to the following:

Places
Big Yellow Mountain, in North Carolina, United States
Huangshan in China, also known as "Yellow Mountain" in English
Little Yellow Mountain (North Carolina), United States
Yellow Mountain (Montana) in the United States

Film
The Yellow Mountain, a 1954 American Western film

Plants
Darwinia collina, commonly known as the yellow mountain bell
Saxifraga aizoides, also known as the yellow mountain saxifrage

Butterfly
Neptis ochracea, the yellow mountain sailer